The Jonker JS-3 Rapture is a glider built of glass-fibre, carbon fibre and Kevlar.

The manufacturer is Jonker Sailplanes of Potchefstroom South Africa, founded in 2004 by two brothers, Attie and Uys Jonker. The structural and chief designer is Attie Jonker, while the airfoil and main aerodynamic features were developed by Johan Bosman in co-operation with the Delft University of Technology.

The first flight of the JS-3 was on 12 December 2016.

Design and development

Type certification of the JS-MD 3 was achieved with EASA on 18 July 2019.

The JS3 is equipped with Tost nose and centre of gravity release hooks, retractable main undercarriage leg with elastomeric shock absorbers, and a fixed pneumatic  tail wheel with an aluminium hub. A retractable  tail wheel can be fitted in place of the fixed tailwheel. Provision is made to fit two 12V LiFePo 7Ah/10Ah main batteries with a fuse box in the luggage compartment's recessed battery boxes, accessible from cockpit. A goose-neck microphone is optional, as are two independent speakers for radio, with the antenna in the rudder and a navigation computer in the instrument panel. The prototype flew in the 2017 World Gliding Championships

Variants
JS-3 Rapture 15mVersion with  wings
JS-3 Rapture 18mVersion with  wings

Specifications (JS3 - RAPTURE 18m)

See also

References

External links

Jonker Sailplanes JS3 Rapture 50th Roll-Out and Test Flight

2000s South African sailplanes
T-tail aircraft